Dickinson v Dodds (1876) 2 Ch D 463 is an English contract law case, heard by the Court of Appeal, Chancery Division, which held that notification by a third party of an offer's withdrawal is effective just like a withdrawal by the person who made an offer. The significance of this case to many students of contract law is that a promise to keep an offer open (an option) is itself a contract which must have some consideration.

Facts
On Wednesday 10 June 1874 Mr Dodds delivered Mr Dickinson an offer to sell some houses for £800, an offer open until 9am on Friday 12 June. On Thursday afternoon, another man called Mr Berry told Mr Dickinson that the houses had already been sold to someone called Mr Allan (who was the second defendant). Mr Dickinson found Mr Dodds in the railway carriage at 7am on Friday, leaving Darlington railway station, and gave his acceptance there. But Mr Dodds said it was too late. Mr Dickinson sued for breach of contract.

Judgment
James LJ held that Mr Berry had conveyed notice of the withdrawal of the offer. After referring to the document of 10 June 1874 he said the following.

Mellish LJ agreed and said,

Baggallay JA concurred.

Significance
Communication of the withdrawal of the offer can be made by any reliable third party. An option must have consideration to be binding.

See also
 Contract
 Offer and acceptance
 Invitation to treat

References

External links
 Text of case at Commonwealth Legal Information Institute site
 Article about the case from Contract Law Blog

English contract case law
1876 in case law
Court of Appeal (England and Wales) cases
1876 in British law